A Trillion Shades of Happy is the only album released by New Zealand rock band Push Push.  It was nominated for album of the year in the annual NZ music awards where the band won Band Of The Year.

Track listing

Singles
"Trippin'" was the first single released and went to No. 1 in New Zealand for six weeks, eventually selling platinum and was the third best-selling single for that year. The band performed this live on the first Hey Hey It's Saturday (Australian entertainment) show broadcast in New Zealand. "Song 27" and "What My Baby Likes" were further New Zealand top ten hits for the band.

Charts

References

External links
Elsewhere.co.nz Do Ya Love Me

1992 debut albums
Push Push (band) albums